Tobias Hegewald (born 3 August 1989 in Neuwied) is a German racing driver.

Career

Karting
Hegewald spent three seasons racing in professional karting, including a 5th place in the 2002 Junior Monaco Kart Cup at ICA Junior level, racing against the likes of Formula Three Euroseries racers Alexander Sims, Jean Karl Vernay, Stefano Coletti and Jules Bianchi and also Sébastien Buemi.

Formula BMW
For 2005, Hegewald moved to open-wheel racing by taking part in both the Formula BMW ADAC series, and the Formula BMW USA series. He finished 20th in the German championship with six points, and finished 15th in the American series, with 22 points and 2 poles, including one at the 2005 Canadian Grand Prix-support race in Montréal.

2006 saw very little improvement for the German, as he finished 13th in the ADAC series, amassing 29 points from 18 races. He again interloped into four rounds of the American series and scored 23 points en route to 14th in that particular championship.

Formula Renault
Hegewald signed for the Oschersleben-based Motorsport Arena team for a dual 2007 campaign in both the Formula Renault 2.0 Northern European Cup and in the Formula Renault Eurocup. Compared to a lacklustre Eurocup campaign, Hegewald battled Frank Kechele for the NEC title, and lost out by 79 points – yet Hegewald's three wins and ten podiums were plenty good enough for him to earn second place in the championship.

With the team renamed to Motopark Academy for 2008, Hegewald continued in the two championships, hoping for some title success. His results in the pan-European championship improved and he ended up a creditable fifth in the championship with two podiums, however he was outperformed on numerous occasions by team-mate Valtteri Bottas, who eventually went on to claim the Eurocup after a hard-fought title battle with Daniel Ricciardo, the highly consistent Andrea Caldarelli and Roberto Merhi. In the NEC, Hegewald won only one race out of 14, as he dropped down to third in the championship. Again, Bottas dominated the title race, and Hegewald was also beaten by António Félix da Costa, as Motopark locked out the top four positions in the championship – Johan Jokinen also finished fourth.

Hegewald competed in the second event of the 2009 Formula Renault 3.5 Series season, replacing Mihai Marinescu at the Interwetten team. The event took place before the start of the 2009 FIA Formula Two Championship season, to which he also committed.

FIA Formula Two Championship
Having competed over the offseason in Formula Palmer Audi, Hegewald signed up to drive in the relaunched FIA Formula Two Championship in 2009. He drove car number 8 in the series, and finished sixth in the championship, including a dominating weekend at Spa, when he took both poles, both fastest laps and both wins. He return to the championship in 2011 after his GP3 Series campaign.

GP3 Series
Hegewald moved to the new GP3 Series for its inaugural season in 2010. He joined Nigel Melker and Renger van der Zande at RSC Mücke Motorsport.

Racing record

Career summary

Complete FIA Formula Two Championship results
(key) (Races in bold indicate pole position) (Races in italics indicate fastest lap)

Complete GP3 Series results
(key) (Races in bold indicate pole position) (Races in italics indicate fastest lap)

References

External links
Tobias Hegewald's official website
Tobias Hegewald career details at driverdb.com

1989 births
Living people
People from Neuwied
German racing drivers
Formula BMW USA drivers
Formula BMW ADAC drivers
Formula Renault 2.0 NEC drivers
Formula Renault Eurocup drivers
Formula Palmer Audi drivers
FIA Formula Two Championship drivers
German GP3 Series drivers
Formula 3 Euro Series drivers
World Series Formula V8 3.5 drivers
Racing drivers from Rhineland-Palatinate
Mücke Motorsport drivers
Motopark Academy drivers